Hôrka is a village and municipality in Poprad District in the Prešov Region of northern Slovakia.

Geography
The municipality lies at an altitude of 610 metres and covers an area of 11.305 km². It has a population of about 1560 people.

History
In historical records the village was first mentioned in 1347.

Economy and infrastructure
Near the village is a wind park. From cultural sightseeings are interesting early gothic Roman Catholic church and a baroque chapel.

See also
 List of municipalities and towns in Slovakia

References

Genealogical resources

The records for genealogical research are available at the state archive "Statny Archiv in Levoca, Slovakia"

External links
https://web.archive.org/web/20160801155048/http://horka.e-obce.sk/
Surnames of living people in Horka

Villages and municipalities in Poprad District